Mazhar Zaidi is a British Pakistani  film producer, artist, journalist, columnist and documentary director. He has produced several issue based documentaries and campaigns. He has developed, managed and delivered large international projects on CVE and produced digital campaigns on rights based issues for leading international non-governmental organisations including UKAid, IRC, CWS, creative Associates and Asia Foundation. He is best known for producing the 2013 Pakistani film Zinda Bhaag, which earned him international recognition and accolades and became the country's first entry to Academy Awards after a gap of over 50 years. The film also won many international awards. One of his films Gardaab which was set in extremist violence prone neighbourhoods of Karachi, screened at London Indian Film Festival in June 2017 and Jeewan Hathi was screened at Locarno Film Festival in Switzerland in August 2017. He along with his partners Meenu Gaur and Farjad Nabi also recently curated an art exhibition titled Art SabKa focussing on contemporary art inspired by Pakistani Cinema.

Career

As a journalist, filmmaker and documentary maker
Before starting to make feature films, Zaidi was a well known journalist and producer at BBC Urdu UK. Zaidi has been working as a filmmaker/journalist for over 25 years. He served as a senior producer at BBC World in London for over 11 years and produced and directed many documentaries and programs for leading international TV networks including BBC, German TV channel, ARD, ZDF, Sky News and other independent media houses.

In 2006, he launched a project with BBC Urdu online and a group of community based filmmakers working with the NGO Interactive Resource Center (IRC) in Pakistan. The successful project produced more than 16 short documentaries, shot and directed by young filmmakers from small towns across Pakistan.

As a filmmaker and independent documentary maker Zaidi has been involved in a number of documentary projects that screened at international film festivals awhile his projects were broadcast by international channels including, BBC Four, ARD and ZDF.

His documentary Nar Narman about an Urdu language Pakistani gay-poet, gave him critical acclaim when it was screened at London's BFI L&G Film Festival in 2007.

As a film producer
Zaidi started his career with producing number of documentaries and videos, at different channels and platforms. But established himself as a recognised producer after producing 2013 Pakistani film Zinda Bhaag, Under his own film production Matteela Films which earned him a critical acclaimed and recognition in film world. Zinda Bhaag became one of the highest-grossing of Pakistan and has won many accolades and recognition including an official selection for Best Foreign Language Film at 86th Academy Awards however was out of the competition for the final race. Zinda Bhaag was only the third Pakistani film in 50 years to get recognition at the Oscars, after 1959's The Day Shall Dawn and 1963's The Veil.

Work and filmography

As a producer

As a documentary maker

As a journalist

Miscellaneous
Zaidi also worked independently contributing a chapter to West and the Muslim World a publication by Transnational Institute, Germany also he exhibited as a Communication Consultant in non-governmental sector and served as a director, short video documentary for the British Council where his work was developing, conceptualising and producing a short video for the International Inspiration, London 2012's international sports legacy program.

Awards

References

External links
 
 

Living people
Pakistani male journalists
Pakistani film directors
Pakistani film producers
British people of Pakistani descent
Year of birth missing (living people)